Roman Yeremin (born 14 January 1997) is a Kazakhstani biathlete. He competed in the 2018 Winter Olympics.

References

1997 births
Living people
Biathletes at the 2018 Winter Olympics
Kazakhstani male biathletes
Olympic biathletes of Kazakhstan
21st-century Kazakhstani people